Anton Tchékhov 1890 is a 2015 French biographical drama film written, directed and produced by René Féret. It stars Nicolas Giraud as the title character, Anton Chekhov. It was released on 18 March 2015, just weeks before Féret's death in April 2015.

Cast 
 Nicolas Giraud as Anton Chekhov
 Lolita Chammah as Macha Chekhova
 Robinson Stévenin as Kolia Chekhov 
 Jacques Bonnaffé as Souvorine
 Jenna Thiam as Lika Mizinova
 Brontis Jodorowsky as Alexandre Chekhov 
 Marie Féret as Anna
 Alexandre Zeff as Isaac
 Philippe Nahon as Grigorovitch
 Frédéric Pierrot as Leo Tolstoy
 Guy Cisterne as Anton's father
 Michelle L'Aminot as Anton's mother

References

External links 
 

2015 films
2015 biographical drama films
French biographical drama films
2010s French-language films
Films directed by René Féret
Biographical films about dramatists and playwrights
Films set in 1890
Films set in Russia
2015 drama films
2010s French films